Jonas Björkman and Nicklas Kulti were the defending champions but only Kulti competed that year with Daniel Vacek.

Kulti and Vacek lost in the quarterfinals to Hendrik Jan Davids and Marc-Kevin Goellner.

David Adams and Olivier Delaître won in the final 3–6, 6–2, 6–1 against Sandon Stolle and Cyril Suk.

Seeds
Champion seeds are indicated in bold text while text in italics indicates the round in which those seeds were eliminated.

 Nicklas Kulti /  Daniel Vacek (quarterfinals)
 Libor Pimek /  Byron Talbot (first round)
 Martin Damm /  Andrei Olhovskiy (semifinals)
 Marius Barnard /  Piet Norval (quarterfinals)

Draw

References
 1997 European Community Championships Doubles Draw

ECC Antwerp
1997 ATP Tour